John Wentz House is a historic home located in Emmitsburg Road (U.S. Route 15), East Fallowfield Township, Chester County, Pennsylvania. The house was built about 1793, and is a two-story, four bay, stuccoed stone vernacular Federal style dwelling.  It has a gable roof and a wraparound verandah.  Also on the property are a contributing barn and spring house.

It was added to the National Register of Historic Places in 1985.

References

Houses on the National Register of Historic Places in Pennsylvania
Federal architecture in Pennsylvania
Houses completed in 1793
Houses in Chester County, Pennsylvania
National Register of Historic Places in Chester County, Pennsylvania